James Weldon Jones (February 28, 1896 – November 24, 1982) was an American administrator and acting High Commissioner to the Philippines.

Jones was born in Copeville, Texas, in Collin County. He went to Baylor University. Jones served in the United States Army during World War I. He served as the Insular Auditor and Financial Adviser to the High Commissioner to the Philippines from 1934 to 1940. Jones served as acting High Commissioner to the Philippines in 1937 and 1939. He then served as assistant director of the Bureau of the Budget from 1941 to 1955. Jones died in Harris County, Texas.

Notes

External links

1896 births
1982 deaths
People from Collin County, Texas
Military personnel from Texas
Baylor University alumni
High Commissioners to the Philippines
United States Office of Management and Budget officials